Dearne Valley was a Parliamentary constituency in South Yorkshire.  The constituency was created in 1950 and abolished in 1983.

Boundaries 
The Urban Districts of Conisbrough, Darfield, Mexborough, Swinton, Wath upon Dearne, and Wombwell.

Members of Parliament

Election results

Elections in the 1970s

Elections in the 1960s

Elections in the 1950s

References

Sources

Richard Kimber's Political Science Resources (Election results since 1951)

Parliamentary constituencies in Yorkshire and the Humber (historic)
Constituencies of the Parliament of the United Kingdom established in 1950
Constituencies of the Parliament of the United Kingdom disestablished in 1983